Air Caucasus was a Georgian airline based in Tbilisi.

History 
Georgy Kodua was the president of Air Caucasus.

Air Caucasus began operation in August 2013. As of May 2014 the airline had 2 McDonnell Douglas MD-83 aircraft and operated regularly scheduled flights to five airports from its hub at Tbilisi Airport. Meanwhile, it ceased operations.

Destinations 
As of May 2014, the airline operated flights to five destinations:

Fleet 
As of May 2014, the Air Caucasus fleet consisted of the following aircraft:

References 

Defunct airlines of Georgia (country)
Airlines established in 2013
Airlines disestablished in 2014
2013 establishments in Georgia (country)
2014 disestablishments in Georgia (country)